James Wilton Auld (1889-1974) was a New Zealand rugby league player who represented New Zealand in 1913.

Early life
Jim Auld was born on January 6, 1889. He was the son of Jessie Auld and Hugh Ballie Auld.

Playing career
In 1912, Auld was part of the first ever Canterbury side. Canterbury went down 4-5 to Wellington on 7 September.

In 1913, Auld captained Sydenham to the championship in the new Canterbury Rugby League competition and again played for Canterbury. He was selected in the New Zealand side and toured Australia, playing against New South Wales in three of the four "tests" during the season.

Auld later became a referee before moving to Palmerston North.

Marriage and Death
Jim Auld married Ada Louisa Sherwood on April 8, 1912. They had two children, William Edward Husk Auld (b. 1915) and Louisa Blanche Auld (b. 1918). William played representative rugby for Wanganui in 1941. Jim Auld died on February 23, 1974, in Auckland. He was buried at Purewa Cemetery in Meadowbank, Auckland.

References

1889 births
1974 deaths
Canterbury rugby league team players
New Zealand national rugby league team players
New Zealand rugby league players
New Zealand rugby league referees
Rugby league props
Sydenham Swans players